After little activity in the 13th and 14th centuries, 15th century Brittany was to see a marked renaissance of carving in stone; it was to be a veritable "golden age" and two main workshops emerged, the "grand atelier ducal du Folgoët", called "ducal" because of the patronage which came from Brittany's ruling family (the atelier was active during the reigns of John V, Duke of Brittany, Francis I, Duke of Brittany, Peter II, Duke of Brittany, Arthur III, Duke of Brittany and Francis II, Duke of Brittany) and the "atelier cornouaillais du Maître de Tronoën". See Listing of the works of the atelier of the Maître de Tronoën. The work of the atelier ("Le grand atelier ducal du Folgoët") can be broken down into two sections, the so-called "first atelier" active from 1423 to 1468 and the "second atelier" active from 1458 to 1509. The article will deal with each of these two workshops and for ease of reference the first atelier's work has been divided into sections, i.e.work on porches in either granite or kersanton stone, calvaries, flagstones/effigies for tombs (gisant), statues and some miscellaneous items. The second atelier section deals with the porch of the Église Saint-Herbot in Plonévez-du-Faou and the Église at Plourac'h.

The Église Notre-Dame at Le Folgoët

What started as the "Chapelle du Folgoët" originated in the reign of John IV, the foundations being laid from 1350 to 1360 but it was during the reign of John V, Duke of Brittany that real progress was made between 1420 and 1422 and in 1423, the Duke founded the chapel college. This is marked by an inscription over the west porch reading "JOHAANES ILLVSTRISSIMVS DVX B(R)ITONVM FVNDAVIT PRAESZE(N)S C(OL)LEGIVM ANNO D(OMI)NI.CCCC.XX.111". Work here was the atelier's first major commission and the carvings are amongst the atelier's best known works.

The nave entrance/portal
This entrance leads to the nave. It  has double doors and in a niche in the trumeau (architecture) is a statue of Alain, the Bishop of Léon. The entrance suffered damage in the 1708 fire but has been restored.

The south entrance/portal

This entrance features three of the bishops mentioned below and a tympanum with a depiction of the Virgin Mary with child.

The "porche des Apôtres" and the gable of the sacristy
At the entrance to this porch, the "porche des Apôtres", so called because it holds statues of the apostles, there is a small statue on the right side bearing a scroll which reads "B(IE)N SOIEZ VE(N)US" and on the left a statue depicting an old man stroking his beard. In a niche in the porch's left side buttress there is a statue of Margaret the Virgin slaying a dragon and in niches in the buttress on the right side are statues of Saint Christopher carrying the baby Jesus on his shoulders, of the Virgin Mary with child and Jean V. In the two doored entrance to the basilica itself at the far end of the porch there is a statue of Saint Peter in the trumeau, the saint seeming to preside over the other apostles whose statues adorn each side of the  porch interior.

The west porch
The west porch suffered badly from the fire of 1708 and the carving in the tympanum was damaged. This carving featured scenes depicting the Nativity, the Adoration of the Magi and the Adoration of the Shepherds. There is a sculpture depicting Saint Michael fighting the dragon to the left of the west porch entrance.

.

The south façade
On the church's south façade are depictions of four saints in the attire of a bishop. The first is on the right side of the second window, The second is in the niche to the left of the south entrance, the third in the trumeau of the south entrance and the fourth in a niche in the right side buttress of the south entrance.

The north entrance/portal
This entrance has little decoration.

The interior
Inside the church are statues by the atelier of John the Evangelist, John the Baptist, Margaret the Virgin and Catherine of Alexandria, and the "Autel des Anges" (the altar of the angels) decorated with carvings of angels.

The fountain
The fountain has its source beneath the main altar inside the basilica and it emerges by the chevet. The fountain comprises a statue of the Virgin Mary within an elaborate arcade. This arcade was restored in 1999.  The statue of Mary is a copy, the original now being kept inside the basilica. It is  much eroded after so many years exposure to the elements.

Images of the atelier's work in the Église Notre-Dame at Le Folgoët

Decoration of porches and portals-mainly using granite
Decoration of the church porch and portal was one of the main areas of activity for the Folgoēt atelier, which will be referred to in the rest of this article as the "atelier", and there are at least nine porches attributed to them.  They specialized mainly in adding carvings of angels, saints and prophets to the niches of the voussures of porch arches, working in either granite or Kersantite, Those six  porches built predominately using granite can be seen at Quimper cathedral, at Saint-Pol-de-Léon in the Kreisker chapel, in what is left of the ancient chapel of Notre-Dame des Portes at Châteauneuf-du-Faou, at Kernascléden, Saint-Fiacre du Faouët and Quimperlė

Quimper's Cathédrale Saint-Corentin

The north porch of the Kreisker chapel

Notre-Dame des Portes

Kernascléden. The Chapelle Notre-Dame

Saint-Fiacre chapel in Le Faouët, Morbihan

Quimperlé. The Église Notre-Dame

Porches using mainly Kersantite

Tombs/Gisant

Calvaries

Gallery of images

Miscellaneous

The second Folgoēt atelier or workshop
The works attributed to the second Folgoēt atelier are-

The porch at Plourac'h
In the Église Saint-Jean-Baptiste the second Folgoēt atelier are attributed with work on the south porch and in particular with the apostles in the porch interior.

The porch of Saint-Herbot
The Église Saint-Herbot in Plonévez-du-Faou has many works attributed to the second atelier. All of the south porch is by the atelier including external and internal voussures, a statue of Saint-Herbot on the trumeau of the double doored entrance to the church at the end of the porch and the statues of the apostles in the porch interior.

Further reading
"Sculpteurs sur pierre en Basse-Bretagne. Les Ateliers du XVe au XVIIe Siècle" by Emmanuelle LeSeac'h. Published by Presses Universitaires de Rennes.

References

Pleyben
Buildings and structures in Finistère